Bone Brothers is an American hip hop duo composed of Bone Thugs-n-Harmony members Layzie Bone and Bizzy Bone.  The first Bone Brothers album was released in 2005. Bizzy Bone had parted ways from the group in 2003 over personal differences and business decisions. Bizzy Bone had always remained friendly with the group and collaborating in songs such as Lil Eazy's This Ain't A Game and Krayzie Bone's Getchu Twisted Remix. The Bone Brothers track Hip-Hop Baby contains four of the five members in the music video. In 2009 the whole group came together to record tracks for Uni5: The World's Enemy during the wake of Flesh-n-Bone's return from prison. Bone Brothers is an album series and not a name for Layzie Bone and Bizzy Bone collaboration albums. Albums like Still Creepin On Ah Come Up
are excluded from the series. It is also conceivable of any pair or more Bone Thugs-N-Harmony members making a Bone Brothers album in the future.

Discography

Studio albums

Compilation albums
The Best of Bone Brothers (2010)

Mixtapes
Bone Brothers IV (2011)

Singles

As a lead artist

References

American musical duos
Hip hop duos
Midwest hip hop groups
Musical groups from Cleveland
Gangsta rap groups